John Joseph Daly (10 November 1891 – 13 April 1942) was an Australian lawyer and politician who served as a Senator for South Australia from 1928 to 1935. He was a member of the Australian Labor Party until 1934, when he was expelled. During the Scullin Government he was the party's Senate leader, and held ministerial office as Vice-President of the Executive Council and briefly as Minister for Defence.

Early life
Daly was born at Hemington, now part of the Adelaide suburb of Thebarton, and educated at St John the Baptist School, Thebarton, but left at 13.  He continued his education at Remington Training College and became an office-boy in the legal firm of Sir Josiah Symon and later conveyancing clerk for William Joseph Denny and Francis Villeneuve Smith.  He was called to the bar in 1919 and handled much trade union work.  He married Eva Bird in October 1918.

Political career
Daly joined the Australian Workers' Union in 1914 and was a member of the executive of the South Australian branch of the Australian Labor Party from 1918 to 1928.  He ran unsuccessfully for the South Australian Legislative Council in 1921 and for the Australian Senate in 1925. He was elected to the Senate in 1928 and was the following June unanimously elected as the ALP's Senate leader, becoming Leader of the Opposition in the Senate.

With the election of the Scullin government in 1929, Daly became Senate leader and Vice-President of the Executive Council and minister in charge of development and migration, and of the Council for Scientific and Industrial Research in the Scullin Ministry.  From August 1930 to January 1931, he acted as Attorney-General and allegedly had H. V. Evatt and Edward McTiernan appointed to the High Court of Australia against Scullin's wishes.  He opposed the Scullin government's deflationary Niemeyer Plan and was removed from cabinet by caucus in March 1931, but following a change in his attitude to support the similar Premiers' Plan was restored to cabinet in June 1931 as minister without portfolio.  He was expelled from the party by the South Australian branch for supporting Scullin's economic policies and failed to gain preselection for the Senate for the 1934 election.

Later life
Following the expiration of his Senate term, Daly returned to his private practice. He died in North Adelaide survived by his wife and his five children.

Notes

 

|-

1891 births
1942 deaths
Australian Labor Party members of the Parliament of Australia
Members of the Australian Senate for South Australia
Members of the Australian Senate
Members of the Cabinet of Australia
Independent members of the Parliament of Australia
Defence ministers of Australia
20th-century Australian politicians